USS Dayton has been the name of two ships in the United States Navy, named after the city of Dayton, Ohio.

 , was renamed and reclassified Monterey (CVL-26) on 31 March 1942, prior to launching.
 , a  light cruiser, served from 1944 until 1949.

United States Navy ship names